Orthogonius cheni is a species of ground beetle in the subfamily Orthogoniinae. It was described by Tian & Deuve in 2001.

References

cheni
Beetles described in 2001